Tatiana L. Erukhimova (Татьяна Ерухимова) is a Russian-born American physicist. As a professor at Texas A&M University, Erukhimova was elected a Fellow of the American Physical Society "for developing and disseminating innovative physics education programs for college students and the public, and for organizing major science festivals in university settings."

Early life and education
Erukhimova completed her Master's degree in Physics in 1987 from N. I. Lobachevsky State University of Nizhny Novgorod and her PhD in the same subject from Russian Academy of Sciences. Upon completing her PhD, Erukhimova accepted a postdoctoral research associate position at Texas A&M University (Texas A&M).

Career
Upon joining the faculty in the College of Science at Texas A&M in 2006, Erukhimova organized science outreach and service to the Texas community including DEEP (Discover, Explore, and Enjoy Physics and Engineering), Physics Show, Just Add Science, and Real Physics Live. She also co-organized the annual Mitchell Institute Physics Enhancement Program and co-authored the textbook Atmospheric Thermodynamics. In recognition of her efforts, Erukhimova was the recipient of Texas A&M's 2012 Distinguished Achievement Award for Teaching and Sigma Xi's 2014 Outstanding Science Communicator Award. 

Following her promotion to Instructional Associate Professor and Outreach Coordinator for the Department of Physics and Astronomy, Erukhimova was named one of two recipients of the 2017 Presidential Professor for Teaching Excellence Award. While working in her new role, she was also selected to serve as Vice-Chair of American Association of Physics Teachers Committee on Science Education for the Public. In 2019, Erukhimova was elected a Fellow of the American Physical Society "for developing and disseminating innovative physics education programs for college students and the public, and for organizing major science festivals in university settings."

In 2021, Erukhimova and her colleagues conducted a review of 10,000 students to conclude there was no evidence that men outperform women in some science courses, specifically physics. Following this, she was appointed to 2021 University Professorships in Undergraduate Teaching Excellence at Texas A&M University and selected as one of the 2021 recipients of the Provost Academic Professional Track Faculty Teaching Excellence Award.

TikTok videos featuring Erukhimova went viral on social media, where she shows physics concepts at work through fun experiments. Her videos have been recorded and posted by students on TikTok, with a select few garnering millions of views. The Texas A&M's Physics & Astronomy Department gained more than 300,000 followers, more than 5.7 million likes, and more than 32 million views. Erukhimova was featured on the The Jennifer Hudson Show and Good Morning America.

References

External links

Living people
Year of birth missing (living people)
Russian women physicists
Texas A&M University faculty
Fellows of the American Physical Society